The 2019 Myanmar National League is the 10th season of the Myanmar National League, the top Myanmar professional league for association football clubs, since its establishment in 2009, also known as MPT Myanmar National League due to the sponsorship deal with Myanma Posts and Telecommunications. A total of 12 teams will compete in the league. The season began on 12 January 2019 and is scheduled to conclude on 24 September 2019.

Yangon United are the defending champions, while Chinland and Dagon have entered as the promoted teams from the 2018 MNL-2.

The 1st transfer window is from 1 November 2018 to 12 January 2019 while the 2nd transfer window is from 1 June 2019 to 31 July 2019.

Changes from last season

Team changes

Promoted Clubs
Promoted from the 2018 MNL-2
 Royal Thanlyin
 Dagon

Relegated Clubs

Relegated from the 2018 Myanmar National League
 Chinland
 Myawady

Royal Thanlyin decided not to play in 2019 MNL because of finance. After that, MNL allowed Chinland to play in 2019 MNL.

2019 Title Sponsor

Myanma Posts and Telecommunications signed 3 years contract with MNL. They help to develop Myanmar Football and Youth program.

Clubs

Stadiums

(*) – not ready to play. MNL clubs that have not had their home stadium ready to host home matches currently use Aung San Stadium and Thuwunna Stadium in Yangon.

Managerial changes

Foreign players

Personnel and sponsoring
Note: Flags indicate national team as has been defined under FIFA eligibility rules. Players may hold more than one non-FIFA nationality.

League table

Positions by round

Results by match played

Matches
Fixtures and results of the Myanmar National League 2019 season.

Week 1

Week 2

Week 3

Week 4

Week 5

Week 6

Week 7

Week 8

Week 9

Week 10

Week 11

Week 12

Week 13

Week 14

Week 15

Week 16

Week 17

Week 18

Week 19

Week 20

Week 21

Week 22

Season statistics

Top scorers
As of 15 September 2019.

Top assistants
As of 16 September 2019.

Clean sheets
As of 15 September 2019.

Hat-tricks

Awards

Monthly awards

See also
2019 MNL-2
2018–19 Myanmar Women's League
2019 General Aung San Shield

References

External links
 Myanmar National League Official Website
 Myanmar National League Facebook Official Page

Myanmar National League seasons
Myanmar
2019 in Burmese football